Buggies Unlimited is the world's largest distributor of golf cart parts and accessories. The company sells to its customers via its website, and catalog mailings.

Locations
The Buggies Unlimited warehouse, phone center, and corporate headquarters are located in Jacksonville, Florida.

History
Founded in 1997, CEO Bart Mahan created Buggies Unlimited out of a desire to combine his life's passions – sports cars and golf. The company began as a golf cart dealership, opening a small showroom in Lexington, Kentucky and creating a basic informational website. After achieving some success with the flagship store, Buggies Unlimited expanded in 1999 by adding another location in Beckley, West Virginia.

In 2000–2001, the company experienced tough times as the economy struggled through the dot-com crash and the September 11 attacks. In addition, the discretionary income of retirees – one of Buggies Unlimited's main demographics – began to dry up. In order to keep the business running, Mahan closed the West Virginia location and scaled back his employees from 16 to 5.

In 2002, Mahan repositioned the company, adjusting the focus from a traditional golf cart dealership to a supplier of golf cart parts and accessories. The shift to a niche market worked, and after launching a catalog and e-commerce website to sell its products, Buggies Unlimited grew at an astounding rate, relocating to larger warehouses twice before settling on the  location in Richmond, Kentucky. Due to a rapid increase in demand in recent years, in 2007 a retail showroom and golf cart service center was also opened in Winchester, Kentucky.

In 2008, the company was bought by Nivel Parts & Manufacturing Co.

Buggy Bonanza
Buggies Unlimited sponsors the Buggy Bonanza, a golf cart show and rally held in Central Kentucky. The Bonanza brings golf cart enthusiasts from across the country together to participate in events such as the mud pit, hill climb, off-road race, and tug-of-war. In addition, many owners bring their customized carts to be judged on appearance, similar to a car show. Individual awards are given out at the end of the Bonanza.

In 2005 and 2006, the Bonanza was held in Richmond, Kentucky, the latter year bringing in 200 people and 70 golf carts from around the country to compete. The 2008 Bonanza was scheduled to be held at the London Dragstrip in London, Kentucky, on July 25–26, 2008.

Awards and nominations
Buggies Unlimited has been recognized several times for its accomplishments in the business world. In 2005, the company won Small Business of the Year from the Lexington Chamber of Commerce. In 2006, Buggies Unlimited was voted one of Kentucky's Best Places to Work and was a finalist for the US Chamber of Commerce's Small Business of the Year. In both 2007 and 2008, the Buggies Unlimited catalog was chosen as a finalist at the Multichannel Merchant Awards, the most prestigious awards program for catalog, internet, and multichannel merchant awards.

References

Golf equipment manufacturers
Companies based in Jacksonville, Florida
Companies established in 1997